The Bonn-Cologne Graduate School of Physics and Astronomy (BCGS) is a joint venture of the Universities of Bonn and Cologne, offering a combined Master's and Doctorate program in Physics.
2007, it was selected for funding by the Deutsche Forschungsgemeinschaft as part of the excellence initiative.

Studies 
The BCGS is open to excellent students from all over the world after the completion of their Bachelor's degree, scholarships are available already for the Master's course on a competitive basis (admission academy).  In the BCGS, the transition from master's to PhD studies is intended to be seamless, although two separate degrees are awarded.

Two of the schools principles are an early introduction to current research (early on research) during and even before work on their masters thesis and continued learning during the PhD phase. During their entire studies, each student is mentored by two professors, one from each university.

Lectures 
The BCGS allows students to attend courses in Cologne and Bonn. To facilitate this, some lectures are transmitted as video conferences. Others take place at both universities in turn.

In addition, intensive weeks take place outside of the regular lecture period. Here, students and lecturers spend one week working full-time on a specific topic.

Recurring events 
During the academic year, the BCGS has several fixed events. Usually, each event alternates between Bonn and Cologne.

Shortly after the start of the winter term in early autumn, the welcome meeting introduces new students to the school. An invited speaker gives a talk about a current topic in physics. Past speakers have included Michael Berry and Walter Kutschera.

A poster session in spring is an opportunity for older students to present their research topics and results. The presenting students receive feedback and new stimuli for their work, and younger students can get an overview of the current research topics pursued at both universities.

In the summer, a physicist will talk about his career after leaving university under the heading Science meets Business.

Notes

External links 
 http://www.gradschool.physics.uni-bonn.de/
 http://www.gradschool.physics.uni-koeln.de/

University of Bonn
Universities and colleges in North Rhine-Westphalia
University of Cologne
Postgraduate schools in Germany
Year of establishment unknown